Gitte Aaen (born 7 November 1981 in Frederikshavn) is a Danish former handballer. She won the Champions League with Viborg in 2009.

Achievements
 Damehåndboldligaen:
Winner: 2008, 2009, 2010
Landspokalturneringen:
Winner: 2006, 2007, 2008
EHF Champions League:
Winner: 2009, 2010

References

External links
 Profile on Randers HK official website

1981 births
Living people
Danish female handball players
People from Frederikshavn
Sportspeople from the North Jutland Region